Plan International Canada is the Canadian arm of the relief organization Plan International, a not-for-profit global movement that promotes social justice for youth and their families in more than 65 developing countries.

Plan International and Plan International Canada have no stated political or religious affiliation.

History and background

John Langdon-Davies, a British journalist, was inspired to found Foster Parents Plan for Children in Spain to help children whose lives were disrupted by the Spanish Civil War.

During World War II, the organization became known as "Foster Parents Plan for War Children" and worked in England, helping displaced children from all over Europe. After the war, Plan extended aid to children in France, Belgium, Italy, the Netherlands, Germany, Greece and briefly in Poland, Czechoslovakia and China.

As Europe recovered from the war, Plan gradually moved out of these countries and opened new programs in less developed countries. It was renamed to "Foster Parents Plan Inc."

Foster Parents Plan of Canada was incorporated in 1968. Plan expanded its work to countries in South America and Asia. In 1962, U.S. First Lady Jacqueline Kennedy was honorary chairwoman during Plan's Silver Jubilee.

In 1974, the global name became Plan International.

In the 1980s, Belgium, Germany, Japan and the UK joined Canada, the US, Australia and the Netherlands as donor countries. Plan was recognized by the Economic and Social Council of the United Nations. In the 1990s, Plan offices opened in France, Norway, Finland, Denmark, Sweden and South Korea.

In the 2000s, the name Plan International was changed to "Plan" and a unified global identity was created to help make the organization more easily recognized around the world. In 2006, Foster Parents Plan in Canada also changed its name to Plan and the logo was updated to reflect this name change.

In 2011, with support from the Canadian government, Plan called on the UN to adopt October 11 as International Day of the Girl Child. In 2012, Plan International's Because I am a Girl initiative (focused on girls' rights) launched on the first International Day of the Girl in 2012.

In 2015, Plan rebranded again as Plan International.

Operation
Plan International Canada attempts to break the cycle of poverty by helping children and adults living in developing countries use their ideas, talents, and energies to shape their future. Before choosing a work site, Plan International Canada analyses the following:

 The community's poverty statistics
 Infant mortality rates (countries with more than 25 deaths per 1,000 live births are given priority)
 Gross National Product (GNP) (GNP per capital should be less than US$1,700); and other factors that are key elements of determining Plan Canada's long-term regional success.

With help from trained volunteers and donations from benefactors, Plan Canada assists community participants in a number of areas, including: building schools, educating teachers, digging wells, opening health clinics, providing vocational training, using technology to improve crop yields, giving people access to small business loans, and providing disaster-related humanitarian assistance.

On average, Plan International Canada works with communities for 10–12 years before phasing out operations in that area. Supported by donors, Plan International Canada assists children and families in becoming active participants in their communities’ development. Worldwide, approximately nine million individuals have become involved in Plan and Plan Canada's child-centered initiatives.

Mission and funding
Plan International Canada’s long-term goal is to empower children, their families and the members of their communities to improve living conditions, establish grassroots organizations, and work with local and national governments. Plan Canada focuses the main thrust of its energies on the children in poorer developing countries’ communities, namely those of Asia, the Caribbean, Africa, Central and South America.

Private and corporate donors have a number of options available to them when giving to Plan International Canada. Many choose to sponsor children by making contributions; in exchange for their contributions, benefactors are given the opportunity to exchange letters and photographs with their sponsored child(ren). Other donors choose to fund projects, assist during and after crises and/or bequest monies to Plan Canada.

Plan International Canada donations are pooled centrally. Funds are then allocated based on in-country developed strategic plans, with a focus on supporting children-related operations and ventures. Typically, 20% of funds raised go to support Plan Canada's operations, public education and fundraising as per Plan's 80:20 rule of allocation.

Plan International Canada adheres to the standards of the Imagine Canada Ethical Fundraising and Financial Accountability Code and supports the Association of Fundraising Professionals’ Donor Bill of Rights.

Plan International is a member agency of the Humanitarian Coalition.  Together with the other partner organizations, the coalition raises money for humanitarian situations around the world.

Recent projects

Plan International and Plan International Canada have been a part of numerous international projects and initiatives, including:
 January 2011 - Plan Canada's Because I Am a Girl wins a Gold Cassie in the not-for-profit category. 
 January 2010 - With over 30 year's experience on the ground, Plan Canada is one of the first NGOs to react to the Haiti earthquake.  Plan is one of 9 NGOs benefiting from a one-hour national telethon called Canada for Haiti which raises $13.5M from the Canadian public.
 September 2009 - Plan announced a $100M Campaign to support girls' rights and a website to engage youth to advocate for girls.
 May 2009–Plan announced its intent to distribute 300,000 IDPs of aid to Sri Lanka.
 April 2009–Plan received $900,000 CDN from Slumdog Millionaire filmmakers to improve the lives of children and their families in Mumbai's poorer communities.
 April 2009–Plan Canada partnered with clothing company Olsen Europe to establish a new line of clothing, the Friendship Collection.
 January 2009–Plan Canada's partnership with The Girls’ Rights Program resulted in a Girls’ Rights Tour. The Girls’ Rights Tour emphasizes self-esteem and awareness of women's issues.
 January 2009–Plan's short film, Flood Children of Holdibari [sic], won first place in the World Bank's Social Dimensions of Climate Change section of their international film festival.
 December 2008–Plan Canada shipped medical supplies to Zimbabwe to combat the cholera outbreak there.
 July 2008–Plan Canada launched its Global Food Crisis Report and announced a $750 million funding initiative.
 November 2007–Plan Canada traveled to Haiti with R&B singer George Nozuka to film a documentary on restaveks, child slaves, in Haiti.

References

External links
 Official Website.
 Toronto Charities List.
 Because I Am A Girl
 Gifts of Hope Catalogue

Children's charities based in Canada